The 2004–05 Genoa C.F.C. season was the club's 112th season in existence and the club's 10th consecutive season in the top flight of Italian football. In addition to the domestic league, Genoa participated in the 2004–05 Coppa Italia. Genoa was put in the last place by the FIGC as punishment because of match fixing in the Caso Genoa.

Pre-season and friendlies

Competitions

Overview

Serie B

League table

Results summary

Results by round

Matches

Coppa Italia

Group stage

Statistics

Goalscorers 

Source:

References

External links

Genoa C.F.C. seasons
Genoa